Jamie Patterson may refer to:

Jamie Solinger, Jamie Patterson (born c. 1975), beauty queen and model
Jamie Patterson, character in No Angels (TV series)

See also
Jamie Paterson (disambiguation)
James Patterson (disambiguation)